An akmon is a multi-ton concrete block used for breakwater and seawall armouring. It was originally designed in the Netherlands in the 1960s, as an improvement on the tetrapod.

References

External links
Official site (Japanese)

Wave-dissipating concrete blocks